‌The 2019 Asian Club League Handball Championship was the 22nd edition of the championship held under the aegis of Asian Handball Federation. The championship was hosted by Korea Handball Federation at Indoor Handball Hall, Samcheok (South Korea) from 7 to 17 November 2019. It was the official competition for men's handball clubs of Asia crowning the Asian champions whose winner will also qualify for the 2020 IHF Super Globe.

Draw
The draw was held on Saturday, 7 September 2019 in the Millennium Hotel & Convention Centre, Salmiya, Kuwait at 19:00 hours in the presence of representatives of the participating clubs.

Seeding
Teams were seeded according to the AHF COC regulations and rankings of the previous edition of the championship. Teams who had not participate in the previous edition were in Pot 4.

●  Doosan Handball Club withdraw from the championship before the final draw.

Group A

Group B

9th - 11th Placement

5th - 8th Placement

Finals

Final standings

References

External links
 Results

Handball competitions in Asia
Asian Handball Championships
Asian Men's Club League Handball Championship, 2019
Asia
International handball competitions hosted by South Korea
November 2019 sports events in South Korea